Olinger is an unincorporated community in Lawrence County, in the U.S. state of Missouri.

History
A post office called Olinger was established in 1902, and remained in operation until 1917. The community has the name of John Olinger, the original owner of the site.

References

Unincorporated communities in Lawrence County, Missouri
Unincorporated communities in Missouri